Franz Wessel  (March 6, 1903 – in Stüblau near Danzig; September 10, 1958) was a German judge. He visited school in Königsberg and studied legal science in Königsberg, Heidelberg and Kiel. He was a justice of the Federal Constitutional Court in the 1950s.

20th-century German judges
Justices of the Federal Constitutional Court
1903 births
1958 deaths